"What Time Is It?" is the opening musical number and first single from the Disney Channel Original Movie High School Musical 2. It is featured on the High School Musical 2 soundtrack, and is the first song off the High School Musical 2 soundtrack.

The song had its world premiere on Radio Disney on May 25, 2007, as part of its Planet Premiere featurette. On June 8, Disney premiered the video as a sneak peek in multiple nations at close to the same time. The single was released on July 16, 2007, worldwide, and on July 17, 2007, in the United States.

Music video 

The song's video clip and the sequence in the movie commence with the whole of the East High Wildcats in a classroom. On the blackboard in that classroom, a photo is visible with Sharpay and Ryan Evans performing "Bop to the Top", next to where it says "School's Out!" A poster for the East High Winter Musical, "Twinkle Town", featuring Troy Bolton (Zac Efron) and Gabriella Montez (Vanessa Hudgens) is also visible. When the clock had ten seconds to go before the bell, the class commenced chanting "summer!" getting louder until the bell rang, after which the song was performed. The music video contains clips directly from the movie, and was released on July 31, 2007, on the iTunes Store. The music video was also released on the Disney Channel.

Other versions
 In November 2007, the cast performed a Christmas version of "What Time Is It?" (i.e.; What time is it? Christmastime!) in Disneyland for the Walt Disney World Christmas Day Parade telecast, as all the cast was there except Zac and Lucas. The broadcast aired on ABC Christmas Day (December 25).
 At Tokyo Disneyland's Jubilation! Parade, part of the song (with revised lyrics) is heard sung in English during the showstop.
Spanish singer Edurne recorded a version of this song on her 2008 album Premiere.

Formats

Charts
The song debuted and peaked at number 6 on the Billboard Hot 100 chart dated August 4, 2007, becoming second top 10 on chart. The song peaked at number 1 on the Billboard Hot Single Sales chart for 28 weeks, which became the highest selling single of the year-end chart in 2007.

References

2007 singles
Ashley Tisdale songs
Corbin Bleu songs
Songs from High School Musical (franchise)
Vanessa Hudgens songs
Zac Efron songs
Lucas Grabeel songs
Songs written by Matthew Gerrard
Songs written by Robbie Nevil
Songs written for films
Walt Disney Records singles
2007 songs